John Fullartine (c. 1652 – October 1738) was governor of the Hudson's Bay Company in the James Bay area of Canada. He replaced James Knight and was replaced by Anthony Beale in 1705.

References 

 

Hudson's Bay Company people
Year of birth uncertain
1738 deaths